Wucheng County is a county in the northwest of Shandong province, People's Republic of China, bordering Hebei province to the northwest. It is administered by Dezhou City.

The population was 365,217 in 1999.

Administrative divisions
As 2012, this County is divided to 1 subdistricts, 4 towns and 3 townships.
Subdistricts
 Guangyun Subdistrict

Towns

Townships
Yangzhuang Township
 Lijiahu Township
Jiamaying Township

Climate

References

External links
 Official site

Wucheng
 
Dezhou